Marcelo Angiolo Melani S.D.B. (15 September 1938 – 14 April 2021) was an Argentine Roman Catholic bishop.

Biography
Melani was born in Italy and was ordained to the priesthood in 1970. He served as coadjutor bishop and bishop of the Roman Catholic Diocese of Viedma, Argentina, from 1993 to 2002 and as bishop of the Roman Catholic Diocese of Neuquén, Argentina from 2002 to 2011.

He died from COVID-19 on 14 April 2021 in Pucallpa, Peru.

Notes

1938 births
2021 deaths
Clergy from Florence
Salesian bishops
20th-century Roman Catholic bishops in Argentina
21st-century Roman Catholic bishops in Argentina
Italian Roman Catholic bishops in South America
Deaths from the COVID-19 pandemic in Peru
Roman Catholic bishops of Viedma
Roman Catholic bishops of Neuquén